Luis Turón Juvantent (born 15 January 1970) is a retired Spanish athlete who specialised in sprinting events. He represented his country at the 1991 World Indoor Championships in Seville reaching the semifinals.

Competition record

References

All-Athletics profile

1970 births
Living people
Spanish male sprinters
Athletes from Catalonia
Mediterranean Games silver medalists for Spain
Mediterranean Games bronze medalists for Spain
Mediterranean Games medalists in athletics
Athletes (track and field) at the 1991 Mediterranean Games
Athletes (track and field) at the 1993 Mediterranean Games